Scopula ocheracea is a moth of the  family Geometridae. It is found in south-eastern India.

References

Moths described in 1891
ocheracea
Moths of Asia